Zack MacEwen (born July 8, 1996) is a Canadian professional ice hockey forward for the Los Angeles Kings of the National Hockey League (NHL). He previously played in the NHL for the Vancouver Canucks and the Philadelphia Flyers.

Career

Junior
The Moncton Wildcats of the Quebec Major Junior Hockey League (QMJHL) noticed MacEwen when he was playing with Amherst, and he began playing with the team during the 2014–15 season, briefly filling in for various skaters who were attending that year's World Junior Championship. After being passed over in the 2015 NHL Entry Draft, he rejoined Moncton for the 2015–16 QMJHL season, scoring 10 goals and 30 assists in 66 games.

On August 12, 2016, the Wildcats traded MacEwen to the Gatineau Olympiques in exchange for a fifth-round selection in the 2017 QMJHL Entry Draft. Although Moncton had expressed interest in retaining him for the 2016–17 QMJHL season, the league only allowed three 20-year-old players per team.

Professional

Vancouver Canucks
On March 3, 2017, he signed a three-year entry level contract with the Vancouver Canucks of the National Hockey League (NHL). He later signed an amateur tryout contract with the Canucks American Hockey League (AHL) affiliate, the Utica Comets, on April 10, 2017. He scored his first career AHL goal on October 29, 2017, against the Charlotte Checkers and ended his first professional season with 33 points in 66 games. He was awarded the Ian Anderson Award as the Comets' Most Improved rookie.

After attending the Canucks training camp, MacEwen was assigned to the Comets to begin the 2018–19 season in the AHL. He was recalled from the AHL on February 10, 2019, after a four-point game the previous night against the Rochester Americans. He subsequently made his NHL debut on February 11, 2019, against the San Jose Sharks. He recorded his first NHL point in his debut with an assist on Derrick Pouliot's goal however the Canucks lost 7–2. MacEwen played four games for Vancouver before eventually being reassigned to Utica.

After spending the first 13 games of the 2019–20 season with the Comets, MacEwen and Tyler Graovac were recalled to the NHL on November 13, with Jalen Chatfield sent down to the AHL in their place. He scored his first NHL goal on December 3 in the first period of a 5-2 victory over the Ottawa Senators. MacEwen was briefly reassigned to Utica when Michael Ferland was activated from concussion protocols, but was called back up four days later when Ferland suffered an additional upper-body injury. After the arrival of Tyler Toffoli sent MacEwen back to Utica, he was recalled once more on January 30, when MacEwen and Justin Bailey were called up in place of an injured Tyler Motte. With the NHL instituting a strict salary cap for the 2020-21 season, Vancouver general manager Jim Benning began looking at MacEwen as an inexpensive everyday NHL player by February 2020. By the time that the COVID-19 pandemic forced the indefinite suspension of the NHL and AHL seasons, MacEwen had five goals, six points, and 20 penalty minutes in 17 games for Vancouver. He also joined Vancouver for the 2020 Stanley Cup playoffs, appearing in six games for a team that defeated the defending champion St. Louis Blues before losing in the second round to the Vegas Golden Knights.

MacEwen signed a two-year contract extension with Vancouver on October 6, 2020, a deal with an average annual value of $825,000. He had difficulty settling into the  season, as several injuries and an outbreak of COVID-19 among players and staff led to a constant rotation of skaters on the fourth line. MacEwan himself only skated in 34 of 56 games in the pandemic-shortened season, notching two points in the process. He was also one of 21 members of the Canucks organization to contract COVID-19, missing two weeks in April with the virus. After being initially asymptomatic, MacEwen suffered from an "uncomfortable tiredness" for a short period of time. MacEwan was also suspended for one game in May for a series of hits on Darnell Nurse of the Edmonton Oilers. While he originally received a minor penalty for high-sticking Nurse after a collision, MacEwan was suspended and fined $7,000 for kneeing a prone Nurse in the head. Neither player left the game, and they fought twice more, once in the second and once in the third period.

Philadelphia Flyers
On October 12, 2021, shortly before the start of the 2021–22 NHL season, the Canucks placed MacEwen on waivers in order to make room for Alex Chiasson, who was being signed to a one-year contract. The Philadelphia Flyers, who were short a forward after an injury to Kevin Hayes, claimed MacEwen off of waivers the next day. After successfully acquiring his US work visa, MacEwen joined the Flyers on October 20, skating on the fourth line alongside Nate Thompson and former QMJHL teammate Nicolas Aubé-Kubel.

As a restricted free agent in the off-season, MacEwen was re-signed to a one-year, $925,000 contract extension with the Flyers on August 2, 2022.

Los Angeles Kings
On March 3, 2023, the Flyers traded MacEwen to the Los Angeles Kings in exchange for Brendan Lemieux and a fifth-round pick in the 2024 NHL Entry Draft.

Personal life
MacEwen is of Scottish descent from his paternal great-grandmother. While being raised in Stratford, Prince Edward Island by parents Craig and Juliana, his family ran a berry farm. On May 6, 2020, it was announced that his father Craig had died.

Career statistics

Awards and honours

References

External links
 

1996 births
Living people
Canadian expatriate ice hockey players in the United States
Canadian ice hockey forwards
Gatineau Olympiques players
Ice hockey people from Prince Edward Island
Lehigh Valley Phantoms players
Los Angeles Kings players
Moncton Wildcats players
Philadelphia Flyers players
Sportspeople from Charlottetown
Undrafted National Hockey League players
Utica Comets players
Vancouver Canucks players